This article incorporates material from the corresponding page in the Portuguese Wikipedia.

The Pantanal is a mid-size pickup truck made by the Brazilian off-road vehicle manufacturer Troller Veículos Especiais S/A from 2006 to 2008. Only 77 Pantanal trucks were built, and all were recalled in February 2008 due to the possibility of cracks forming in the chassis. Ford, the current owner of Troller, announced that they would take back all 77 trucks, thus making the Pantanal obsolete unless an owner wished to keep their Pantanal.

References

 :pt:Troller_Pantanal, Retrieved 2010-02-07

Cars of Brazil
Pickup trucks
Cars introduced in 2006